FC Belshina Bobruisk (FK Belshyna Babruisk) is a Belarusian football club based in Bobruisk. The team has won one Belarusian Premier League title, as well as 3 Belarusian Cup titles.

History of the club and football in Bobruisk
The city of Bobruisk was represented by its football team as early as 1920s, when in 1926 a collective football team of Bobruisk city won the Belarusian football championship. Winning the 1926, Bobruisk football team became the first from a provincial city that won the republican competitions. Until 1958, it was the only achievement of the Bobruisk football. In 1958, Spartak Bobruisk became a champion of Belarus donating the second title to the Bobruisk city football.

In 1972 and 1973, Stroitel Bobruisk also won a title of the champion of Belarus.

The current club was founded in 1976 as Shinnik Bobruisk. Since the inception the team was attached to and later sponsored by local tire manufacturing company Belshina. The club spent most of Soviet-era seasons in the Belarusian SSR league (with a couple of seasons in the Mogilev Oblast league). Shinnik won the league title twice (in 1978 and 1987) and also won the Belarusian SSR Cup in 1979.

In 1992, Shinnik joined the Belarusian First League and in 1994, they were promoted to the Premier League. In 1996, they were renamed to Belshina Bobruisk. The club's most successful seasons came in the late 1990s and early 2000s. Belshina won the champions title in 2001, finished as runners-up in 1997 and won the Belarusian Cup three times (1997, 1999, 2001).

Name changes
1976: Founded as Shinnik Bobruisk
1996: Renamed to Belshina Bobruisk

Honours
 Belarusian Premier League
 Winners (1): 2001
 Runners-up (1): 1997
 3rd place (2): 1996, 1998
 Belarusian Cup
 Winners (3): 1997, 1999, 2001

Current squad
As of March 2023

Domestic results

1 3 points deducted for unpaid transfer.
2 2 points deducted due to transfer irregularities in the previous season.

European results

Managers
 Liudas Rumbutis (July 1, 1998 – Dec 31, 1999), (Jan 1, 2003 – Dec 31, 2003)
 Vladimir Gevorkyan (Jan 1, 2003 – Jan 13, 2004)
 Oleg Volokh (interim) (May 14, 2004 – May 27, 2004)
 Sergei Borovsky (Sept 3, 2004 – Dec 31, 2004)
 Oleg Volokh (Jan 1, 2006 – May 11, 2006)
 Mikhail Markhel (May 16, 2006 – Dec 31, 2006)
 Aleksandr Sednev (Jan 1, 2009 – Nov 30, 2011)
 Sergey Yaromko (Jan 1, 2012 – July 21, 2012)
 Vitaliy Pavlov (caretaker) (July 21, 2012 – July 23, 2012)
 Aleksandr Sednev (July 23, 2012 – December 31, 2015)
 Vitaliy Pavlov (January 1, 2016 – )

References

External links
Official website

Football clubs in Belarus
Association football clubs established in 1976
Babruysk
1976 establishments in Belarus